Royal line of succession may refer to:
Succession to the British throne
Line of succession to the Spanish throne